Rollo (Rolloun; ; ; died between 928 and 933) was a Viking who, as Count of Rouen, became the first ruler of Normandy, today a region in northern France. He emerged as the outstanding warrior among the Norsemen who had secured a permanent foothold on Frankish soil in the valley of the lower Seine. After the Siege of Chartres in 911, Charles the Simple, the king of West Francia, granted them lands between the mouth of the Seine and what is now Rouen in exchange for Rollo agreeing to end his brigandage, swearing allegiance to him, religious conversion and a pledge to defend the Seine's estuary from Viking raiders.

The name Rollo is first recorded as the leader of these Viking settlers in a charter of 918, and he continued to reign over the region of Normandy until at least 928. He was succeeded by his son William Longsword in the Duchy of Normandy that he had founded. The offspring of Rollo and his followers, through their intermingling with the indigenous Frankish and Gallo-Roman population of the lands they settled, became known as the "Normans". After the Norman conquest of England and their conquest of southern Italy and Sicily over the following two centuries, their descendants came to rule England, much of Ireland, Sicily and Antioch from the 11th to 13th centuries, leaving behind an enduring legacy in the histories of Europe and the Near East.

Name

The Heimskringla (written in the 13th century) records that Rolf the Ganger went to Normandy and ruled it, so it is that Rollo is generally presumed to be a latinisation of the Old Norse name Hrólfr – a theory that is supported by the rendition of Hrólfr as Roluo in the Gesta Danorum by Saxo Grammaticus. It is also sometimes suggested that Rollo may be a Latinised version of another Norse name, Hrollaugr.

The 10th-century French historian Dudo in his Historia Normannorum records that Rollo took the baptismal name Robert. A variant spelling, Rou, is used in the 12th-century Norman French verse chronicle Roman de Rou, which was compiled by Wace and commissioned by King Henry II of England, a descendant of Rollo.

Origins and historiography

Rollo was born in the mid-9th century; his place of birth is almost definitely located in the region of Scandinavia, although it is uncertain whether he is Danish or Norwegian. The earliest well-attested historical event associated with Rollo is his part in leading the Vikings who besieged Paris in 885–886 but were fended off by Odo of France.

Sources do not make clear the year of Rollo's birth, but from his activity, marriage, children, and death, the mid-9th-century may be inferred.

Medieval sources contradict each other regarding whether Rollo's family was Norwegian or Danish in origin. In part, this disparity may result from the indifferent and interchangeable usage in Europe, at the time, of terms such as "Vikings", "Northmen", "Swedes", "Danes", "Norwegians" and so on (in the Medieval Latin texts  means 'Danes or Northmen').

Among biographical remarks about Rollo written by the cleric Dudo of Saint-Quentin in the late 10th century, he claimed that Rollo "the Dane" was from Dacia, and had moved from there to the island of Scanza. One of Rollo's great-grandsons and a contemporary of Dudo was known as Robert the Dane. However, Dudo's Historia Normannorum (or Libri III de moribus et actis primorum Normanniae ducum) was commissioned by Rollo's grandson, Richard I of Normandy and – while Dudo likely had access to family members and/or other people with a living memory of Rollo – this fact must be weighed against the text's potential biases, as an official biography.

According to Dudo, an unnamed king of Denmark was antagonistic to Rollo's family, including his father – an unnamed Danish nobleman – and Rollo's brother Gurim. Following the death of their father, Gurim was killed and Rollo was forced to leave Denmark. Dudo appears to have been the main source for William of Jumièges (after 1066) and Orderic Vitalis (early 12th century), although both include additional details.

A Norwegian background for Rollo was first explicitly claimed by Goffredo Malaterra (Geoffrey Malaterra), an 11th-century Benedictine monk and historian, who wrote: "Rollo sailed boldly from Norway with his fleet to the Christian coast." Likewise, the 12th-century English historian William of Malmesbury stated that Rollo was "born of noble lineage among the Norwegians".

A chronicler named Benoît (probably Benoît de Sainte-More) wrote in the mid-12th-century Chronique des ducs de Normandie that Rollo had been born in a town named "Fasge". This has since been variously interpreted as referring to Faxe, in Sjælland (Denmark), Fauske, in Sykkulven (Norway), or perhaps a more obscure settlement that has since been abandoned or renamed. Benoît also repeated the claim that Rollo had been persecuted by a local ruler and had fled from there to "Scanza island", by which Benoît probably means Scania (Swedish ). While Faxe was physically much closer to Scania, the mountainous scenery of "Fasge", described by Benoît, would seem to be more like Fauske. Benoît says elsewhere in the Chronique that Rollo is Danish.

Snorri Sturluson identified Rollo with Hrólf the Walker (Norse ; Danish ) from the 13th-century Icelandic sagas, Heimskringla and Orkneyinga Saga. Hrólf the Walker was so named because he "was so big that no horse could carry him". The Icelandic sources claim that Hrólfr was from Møre in western Norway, in the late 9th century and that his parents were the Norwegian jarl Rognvald Eysteinsson ('Rognvald the Wise') and a noblewoman from Møre named Hildr Hrólfsdóttir. However, these claims were made three centuries after the history commissioned by Rollo's own grandson.

There may be circumstantial evidence for kinship between Rollo and his historical contemporary Ketill Flatnose, King of the Isles – a Norse realm centred on the Western Isles of Scotland. In addition, both Irish and Icelandic sources suggest that Rollo, as a young man, visited or lived in Scotland, where he had a daughter named Cadlinar ('Kathleen'). Ketill Flatnose's ancestors were said to have come from Møre – Rollo's ancestral home in the Icelandic sources.

Biography

Dudo's chronicle about Rollo seizing Rouen in 876 is supported by the contemporary chronicler Flodoard, who records that Robert of the Breton March waged a campaign against the Vikings, nearly levelling Rouen and other settlements. Eventually he conceded "certain coastal provinces" to them.

According to Dudo, Rollo struck up a friendship in England with a king called Alstem. This has puzzled many historians, but recently the puzzle has been resolved by recognition that this refers to Guthrum, the Danish leader whom Alfred the Great baptised with the baptismal name Athelstan, and then recognised as king of the East Angles in 880.

Dudo recorded that when Rollo controlled Bayeux by force, he carried off with him the beautiful Popa or Poppa, a daughter of Berenger, Count of Rennes. He married her and she gave birth to his son and heir, William Longsword. Her parentage is uncertain and may have been invented after the fact to legitimize her son's lineage, as many of the fantastic genealogical claims made by Dudo were. She may have come from any country with which the Norse had contact, as Dudo is a highly unreliable source who may have written his chronicle primarily as a didactic text to teach courtly values. 

There are few contemporary mentions of Rollo. In 911, Robert I of France, brother of Odo, again defeated another band of Viking warriors in Chartres with his well-trained horsemen. This victory paved the way for Rollo's baptism and settlement in Normandy. In return for formal recognition of the lands he possessed, Rollo agreed to be baptised and assisted the king in defending the realm. As was the custom, Rollo took the baptismal name Robert, after his godfather Robert I. 

The seal of the agreement was to be a marriage between Rollo and Gisela, daughter of Charles. Gisla might have been a legitimate daughter of Charles. Since Charles first married in 907, that would mean that Gisela was at most 5 years old at the time of the treaty of 911 which offered her in marriage. It has therefore been speculated that she could have been an illegitimate daughter. However a diplomatic child betrothal need not be doubted. 

The earliest record of Rollo is from 918, in a charter of Charles III to an abbey, which referred to an earlier grant to "the Normans of the Seine", namely "Rollo and his associates" for "the protection of the kingdom". Dudo retrospectively stated that this pact took place in 911 at Saint-Clair-sur-Epte.

Dudo narrates a humorous story not repeated in other primary sources about Rollo's pledge of fealty to Charles III as part of the Treaty of Saint-Clair-sur-Epte. The attendant bishops urged Rollo to kiss the king's foot to prove his allegiance. Rollo refused, saying "I will never bow my knees at the knees of any man, and no man's foot will I kiss." Instead, Rollo commanded one of his warriors to kiss the king's foot. The warrior complied by raising the king's foot to his mouth while the king remained standing, which "caused the king to topple backward" much to the amusement of their entourage. On taking his oath of fealty, Rollo divided the lands between the rivers Epte and Risle among his chieftains, and settled in the de facto capital Rouen.

Given Rouen and its hinterland in return for the alliance with the Franks, it was agreed upon that it was in the interest of both Rollo himself and his Frankish allies to extend his authority over Viking settlers. This would appear to be the motive for later concessions to the Vikings of the Seine, which are mentioned in other records of the time.
With their combined army they marched to his aid in fulfillment of their pledge to the Carolingians, but were stopped at the Oise river by Charles' opponents who traded their cooperation for more territorial concessions. The need for an agreement was particularly urgent when Robert I, successor of Charles III, was killed in 923.

Rudolph was recorded as sponsoring a new agreement by which a group of Norsemen were conceded the provinces of the Bessin and Maine. These settlers were presumed to be Rollo and his associates, moving their authority westward from the Seine valley. It is still unclear as to whether Rollo was being given lordship over the Vikings already settled in the region in order to domesticate and restrain them, or the Franks around Bayeux in order to protect them from other Viking leaders settled in eastern Brittany and the Cotentin peninsula.

Rollo died sometime between a final mention of him by Flodoard in 928, and 933, the year in which a third grant of land, usually identified as being the Cotentin and Avranchin areas, was given to his son and successor William.

Descendants

Rollo's son and heir, William Longsword, and grandchild, Richard the Fearless, forged the Duchy of Normandy into West Francia's most cohesive and formidable principality. The descendants of Rollo and his men assimilated with the French-Catholic culture and became known as the Normans, lending their name to the region of Normandy.

Rollo is the great-great-great-grandfather of William the Conqueror the progenitor of House of Normandy in England, however Charles III and the British Royal Family are not direct male-line descendants of Rollo as the House of Normandy ended with the death of Henry I. However the House of Plantagenet have influence from the Norman dynasty, as Empress Matilda, the mother of Henry II of England was the daughter of the Norman king Henry I.

A genetic investigation into the remains of Rollo's grandson Richard the Fearless, and his great-grandson Richard the Good, was announced in 2011 with the intention of discerning the origins of the historic Viking leader. On 29 February 2016, Norwegian researchers opened Richard the Good's tomb and found a lower jaw with eight teeth in it. However, the skeletal remains in both graves turned out to significantly predate Rollo and therefore are not related to him.

Legacy
After Rollo's death, his descendants continued to rule Normandy until the fall of the French monarchy. Most of the Capetian kings descended from Rollo through various lines. Henry V, a descendant of John Lackland, reconquered Normandy as part of his conquest of France. It was lost again during the reign of his son Henry VI. Rollo's dynasty was able to survive through a combination of ruthless military actions and infighting among the Frankish aristocracy, which left them severely weakened and unable to combat the Rouen Vikings' growing determination to stay put.

Depictions in fiction
Rollo is the subject of the 17th-century play Rollo Duke of Normandy, written by John Fletcher, Philip Massinger, Ben Jonson, and George Chapman.

A character, broadly inspired by the historical Rollo but including many events from before the real Rollo was born, played by Clive Standen, is Ragnar Lothbrok's brother in the History Channel television series Vikings.

Rollo is a character in the video game Assassin's Creed Valhalla.

References

Citations

Sources

Further reading

Primary texts
 
 
 
 . Republished 1981, Harmondsworth: Penguin. .

Secondary texts
 
 
 
 
 

 
9th-century births
930s deaths
Year of birth uncertain
Year of death uncertain
10th-century Dukes of Normandy
Viking rulers
Norman warriors
Viking warriors
10th-century rulers in Europe
Converts to Christianity from pagan religions
Burials at Rouen Cathedral
House of Normandy
10th-century Vikings